Libivirumab is a human monoclonal antibody directed against the hepatitis B virus.

References

Monoclonal antibodies
Experimental drugs